Pujini Ruins (Magofu ya mji wa kale wa Pujini in Swahili ) is a Medieval historic site next to the village of Pujini located in Chake Chake District of Pemba South Region. There used to be a fortified palace at the site, only ruins of the walls remain. The palace is believed to have been of Mkame Mdume. Its one of several National Historic Sites on the island of Pemba including Chambani and Ras Mkumbuu.

See also
Historic Swahili Settlements

References

Swahili people
Swahili city-states
Swahili culture
Pemba Island